Nyls Wallace Rex Nyman (born March 7, 1954) is an American former professional baseball outfielder. He played in Major League Baseball (MLB) from 1974 to 1977 for the Chicago White Sox.

Nyman was selected by the White Sox in the 16th round of the 1972 Major League Baseball draft. By 1974, he was already making an appearance at the major league level, going 9-for-14 in a September tryout. In , Nyman split time in left field with Jerry Hairston, playing 106 games with the White Sox, batting .226. He never again played in the major leagues, his big league career over at the age of 23.

In September, 1977 he was traded to the St. Louis Cardinals as part of the deal that brought ace reliever Clay Carroll to Chicago.  He played two more seasons in the minor leagues, with his final season coming in 1979 with the Indianapolis Indians.

Nyman is the brother of fellow former major leaguer Chris Nyman. He is currently an assistant baseball coach at Lassen Community College in Susanville, California.

Sources

Major League Baseball outfielders
Chicago White Sox players
Gulf Coast White Sox players
Appleton Foxes players
Knoxville Sox players
Iowa Oaks players
New Orleans Pelicans (baseball) players
Springfield Redbirds players
Indianapolis Indians players
Baseball players from Detroit
1954 births
Living people